The 1982 San Diego Padres season was the 14th in franchise history.  The Padres finished with a record of 81 wins and 81 losses (.500), good for fourth place in the NL West, eight games behind the division champion Atlanta Braves.

Offseason
December 10, 1981: Ozzie Smith, Steve Mura and a player to be named later were traded by the Padres to the St. Louis Cardinals for Sixto Lezcano, Garry Templeton and a player to be named later.
January 27, 1982: Craig Stimac was purchased from the Padres by the Cleveland Indians.
February 19, 1982: The Padres and Cardinals completed their December 10 deal, with the Padres sending Al Olmsted to the Cardinals and the Cardinals sending Luis DeLeón to the Padres.
February 22, 1982: Barry Evans was purchased from the Padres by the New York Yankees.
February 25, 1982: John Littlefield was released by the Padres.

Regular season
In 1982, Sixto Lezcano became the only player to hit grand slams on two different opening day games. He hit the first grand slam in 1980.
July 19, 1982: Tony Gwynn made his Major League Baseball debut. In a 7-6 loss to the Philadelphia Phillies, Gwynn had four at-bats with two hits, one run scored, and one RBI.
September 18, 1982: Clyde McCullough was serving as the Padres' bullpen coach when he was found dead in his San Francisco hotel room on September 18 during a road trip. He was a catcher in Major League Baseball for 15 years (1940's-1950's) for the Chicago Cubs and Pittsburgh Pirates. He was interred in Rosewood Memorial Park Cemetery, Virginia Beach, Virginia.

Season standings

Record vs. opponents

Opening Day starters
Juan Bonilla
Juan Eichelberger
Ruppert Jones
Terry Kennedy
Sixto Lezcano
Broderick Perkins
Gene Richards
Luis Salazar
Garry Templeton

Notable transactions
May 22, 1982: Kim Seaman was traded by the Padres to the Montreal Expos for Jerry Manuel.
June 7, 1982: Mark Wasinger was drafted by the Padres in the 3rd round of the 1982 Major League Baseball draft.
June 8, 1982: Danny Boone was traded by the Padres to the Houston Astros for Joe Pittman.
June 8, 1982: Jerry Manuel was traded by the Padres to the Montreal Expos for a player to be named later. The Expos completed the deal by sending Mike Griffin to the Padres on August 30.
September 1, 1982: Benito Santiago was signed by the Padres as an amateur free agent.

Roster

Player stats

Batting

Starters by position
Note: Pos = Position; G = Games played; AB = At bats; H = Hits; Avg. = Batting average; HR = Home runs; RBI = Runs batted in

Other batters
Note: G = Games played; AB = At bats; H = Hits; Avg. = Batting average; HR = Home runs; RBI = Runs batted in

Pitching

Starting pitchers
Note: G = Games pitched; IP = Innings pitched; W = Wins; L = Losses; ERA = Earned run average; SO = Strikeouts

Other pitchers
Note: G = Games pitched; IP = Innings pitched; W = Wins; L = Losses; ERA = Earned run average; SO = Strikeouts

Relief pitchers
Note: G = Games pitched; IP = Innings pitched; W = Wins; L = losses; SV = Saves; ERA = Earned run average; SO = Strikeouts

Award winners

1982 Major League Baseball All-Star Game
Ruppert Jones, reserve

Farm system

References

External links
1982 San Diego Padres team at Baseball-Reference
1982 San Diego Padres team page at Baseball Almanac

San Diego Padres seasons
San Diego Padres season
San Diego Padres